Vladimir Andreyevich (1533 – 9 October 1569) was the last appanage Russian prince. His complicated relationship with his cousin, Ivan the Terrible, was dramatized in Sergei Eisenstein's movie Ivan the Terrible.

The only son of Andrey of Staritsa and Princess  Evfrosinia Staritskaia née Khovanskaia, Vladimir spent his childhood under strict surveillance in Moscow. In 1542, he was reinstated in his father's appanages, Staritsa and Vereya. There he married and lived in peace until 1553, when the tsar fell mortally ill.

During the final crisis of Ivan's illness, most boyars refused to swear fealty to his baby son and decided to put Vladimir on the throne instead. To their dismay, the tsar rapidly recovered, but a great change took place in his behaviour and manners. He summoned Vladimir to Moscow and signed with him a treaty whereby Vladimir was to live in Moscow with a small retinue and avoid contacts with Ivan's boyars. In the event of the tsar's death, Vladimir was to become regent for his minor son. 

After Vladimir's mother was forced to take the veil and his boyars exiled, Ivan permitted Vladimir to marry Princess Eudoxia Romanovna Odoevskaya in April 1555. With the start of Oprichnina, however, Ivan's suspicions against his cousin were resuscitated. In 1564 the Oprichniks burnt Vladimir's palace in Moscow, and most of his lands were confiscated into Oprichnina. In 1569, accused of high treason by Ivan IV, Vladimir and his children were forced to take poison at Ivan's residence of Alexandrov. His mother and wife, who resided at the Goritsy Convent near Vologda, were forcibly drowned in the Sheksna River several days later.

The extermination of Vladimir's family precipitated the extinction of the Muscovite branch of the Rurik Dynasty and the dynastic crisis known as the Time of Troubles. Vladimir's only surviving daughter, Maria, was married in 1573 to king Magnus of Livonia (son of Christian III of Denmark). Upon her husband's death, she was summoned from Courland to the court of Boris Godunov and forced to take the veil in a convent adjacent to the Troitse-Sergiyeva Lavra. In 1609, Maria entered into correspondence with her false cousin who had proclaimed himself tsar. Her subsequent fate is not documented.

References

External links

1533 births
1569 deaths
Rurik dynasty
Tsardom of Russia people
16th-century Russian people
People of Byzantine descent
Deaths by poisoning